Stevie J & Joseline: Go Hollywood is a reality television series featuring Stevie J and Joseline Hernandez. The show premiered on January 25, 2016 on VH1 and is the second spin-off of Love & Hip Hop: Atlanta.

Series synopsis

Overview and casting
Stevie J & Joseline: Go Hollywood chronicles the lives of Stevie and Joseline in Los Angeles, California as they prepare for their movie project That Time of the Month.

Several members of Stevie J's family appear as supporting cast members in green screen confessional interview segments throughout the series. They include Stevie's children Stevie Jordan Jr., Sade Jordan and Savannah Jordan and Stevie's ex-girlfriend and Love & Hip Hop: Atlanta co-star Mimi Faust. P. Diddy, K. Michelle, Stevie's friend Tony DeNiro, porn star Skin Diamond, Grammy Award-winning singer Faith Evans, reality star Brandi Glanville, choreographer Laurieann Gibson, Stevie's oldest son Dorian Jordan, basketball player Tamera Young, radio host Big Boy, Russell Simmons, Stevie Jr. and Savannah's mother Carol Antoinette Bennett, Stevie's mother Penny Daniels, Stevie's father Moses Jordan and Stevie's youngest daughter at the time, Eva Jordan, would make guest appearances.

The series was picked up for a second season, but did not return due to Stevie and Joseline's separation. Instead, Stevie went on to star in a solo series, Leave It To Stevie, which premiered on December 19, 2016, and Joseline starred in her own special, Joseline's Special Delivery, which premiered on May 1, 2017 and documented the birth of their child.

Episodes

References

External links
 

Love & Hip Hop
2010s American reality television series
2016 American television series debuts
2016 American television series endings
English-language television shows
VH1 original programming
Television shows set in Los Angeles